Andrés Navarro Sanchez (born 24 December 1963) is a Brazilian businessman and ex-president of Brazilian sports club Corinthians. He was elected on 9 October 2007, winning the elections with 175 votes. He was succeeded by Mario Gobbi in early 2012. On early February 2018, Sanchez returned to the presidency of the team with 1,235 votes. He was succeeded by Duilio Monteiro Alves in 2021.

In a plea to the Brazilian Public Prosecutor's Office, executives of the contractor Odebrecht presented a spreadsheet detailing payments of R$3 million (approximately US$932,000) in caixa 2. In the end of 2017, Prosecutor General Raquel Dodge denounced Sanchez to the Supreme Federal Court for the crime of tax evasion.

References

External links 

 

1963 births
Living people
Brazilian people of Spanish descent
People from Limeira
Brazilian football chairmen and investors
Workers' Party (Brazil) politicians